Andreas Kleinlein (1864–1925) was a German anarchist. He came into contact with anarchist ideas through his travels to France. He was active in the musical instrument-maker union in Berlin and a founding member of the Free Association of German Trade Unions (FVdG), one of the most influential anarchists in the organization.

References
Döhring, Helge: Generalstreik! Streiktheorien und -diskussionen innerhalb der deutschen Sozialdemokratie vor 1914. Grundlagen zum Generalstreik mit Ausblick, Lich 2009
Döhring, Helge: Syndikalismus in Deutschland 1914–1918, Lich 2013
Rübner, Hartmut: "Eine Analyse des revolutionären Syndikalismus in Deutschland". Retrieved September 6, 2007.

1864 births
1925 deaths
German anarchists
Members of the Free Association of German Trade Unions